Marceau is a French name.

People with the surname 
Félicien Marceau (1913–2012), Belgian-French writer
François Séverin Marceau-Desgraviers (1769–1796), French general
Gilles Marceau (1928–2008), Canadian lawyer and politician
Jean-François Marceau (born 1976), Canadian judoka
Joseph Marceau (1879–1955), Canadian contractor and political figure
Marcel Marceau (1923–2007), French mime
Olivier Marceau (born 1973), French athlete
Richard Marceau (born 1970), Canadian politician
Sophie Marceau (born 1966), French actress
Theodore C. Marceau (1859–1922), American photographer

Fictional characters 
William (Bill) Marceau, long running character in the crime/mystery serial The Edge of Night (1957–1979)

People with the given name 
 Marceau Fourcade (fl. 1905–1936), French rower
 Marceau Pivert (1895–1958), French schoolteacher, trade unionist, Socialist militant and journalist
 Marceau Somerlinck (1922–2005), French football player

See also 
 Marceau-class ironclad, a type of ironclad battleships of the French Navy
 French ironclad Marceau